Maidstone is a town in northwest Saskatchewan, Canada located 57 km (35 miles) east of Lloydminster and 84 km (52 miles) west of North Battleford at the junction of Highway 16 and Highway 21.  The community was named after Maidstone, Kent, England.

It is mentioned in Joni Mitchell's "Song For Sharon" from her Hejira album and is one of the places in western Canada in which she lived as a young child. The song's seventh verse begins: "When we were kids in Maidstone, Sharon/I went to every wedding in that little town/To see the tears and the kisses/And the pretty lady in the white lace wedding gown..."

Demographics 

History 
In the spring of 1903, settlers began arriving in the Maidstone area, many of whom were Barr Colonists. These settlers would be followed by African American settlers from the U.S. and a significant number of Mennonites after the construction of the Canadian Northern Railway through the region in 1905. John Henry “Jack” Wesson settled in the area in 1907. He became one of Saskatchewan's foremost farm leaders and became the first president of the Canadian Federation of Agriculture in 1936 and the president of the Saskatchewan Wheat Pool in 1937.  In 1955 Maidstone officially became a town.  Oil and gas development in the 1970s created conditions for growth in the community.  The booming economy resulted in the town's population growing  from less than 700 at the beginning of the decade to over 1,000 by 1981.

Shiloh People
African Americans from Oklahoma settled in the Eldon district near Maidstone in 1909 creating the first and only African-American farming community in the province.  In 1907 Oklahoma and the Indian Territory merged to become a State.  The new government enacted segregation and laws disenfranchising African Americans.  As a result, many decided to emigrate to Western Canada to take advantage of offers of free homesteads. About 10 or 12 families, led by Julius Caesar Lane and Joseph Mayes founded the Shiloh colony in the RM of Eldon. At its height in the late 1920s, the colony boasted between 50 and 75 African American families. Today, all that remains of the Shiloh community is a log building called Shiloh Baptist Church, built in 1911 and abandoned in 1940, as well as a graveyard known as the Shiloh Baptist Cemetery located about 29 km northeast of Maidstone. In 1991 the church and cemetery were designated a heritage property.

Charlow (Shiloh) Baptist Church located north of Maidstone in the rural municipality of Eldon was built in 1912. It was founded by 12 African American families from Oklahoma in 1910.

Attractions 

CNR Station in Maidstone was built in 1905.
Charlow (Shiloh) Baptist Church and Cemetery located north of Maidstone was built in 1912. It was founded by 12 African American families in 1910.
Silver Lake Regional Park and Silver Lake Golf Club (9-hole golf course) 
Delfrari-Victoria Park where the Maidstone & District Museum is located.

Transportation

Sports
Maidstone is the home of the Maidstone Jets, who play in the North Saskatchewan River Hockey League (NSRHL). The Maidstone Jets are the 2011-2012 League Champions, defeating the regular season champions Meadow Lake Stampeders, 4 games to 1 in the best of seven series. It is Maidstone's first league championship since 1967. The road to the championship defeat the Turtleford Tigers 3-0 in the best of five series, with Maidstone having home ice advantage. The next series was best of five with the St. Walburg Eagles holding home ice. The Jets won that series 3 games to none, sending them to the final versus the Stampeders.

See also 
 List of communities in Saskatchewan
 List of towns in Saskatchewan

References 

Towns in Saskatchewan
Black Canadian settlements
Populated places established by African Americans
Eldon No. 471, Saskatchewan